The 1972–73 SK Rapid Wien season was the 75th season in club history.

Squad

Squad and statistics

Squad statistics

Fixtures and results

League

Cup

Cup Winners' Cup

References

1972-73 Rapid Wien Season
Rapid